Microplexia costimaculalis is a moth of the family Noctuidae. It is endemic on the island of Réunion in the Indian Ocean. It has a wingspan of 22–24 mm.

The larvae feed on Clerodendrum speciosissimum and Asystasia gangetica.

References

Acontiinae
Moths described in 1992
Moths of Réunion
Endemic fauna of Réunion